Vidovdansko Naselje is an urban neighborhood of the city of Novi Sad, Serbia.

Name
Name of the neighborhood derived from Vidovdan, the Serbian veneration of Saint Vitus, thus the English translation of the settlement's name would be "the Saint Vitus day's settlement". Saint Vitus is also the patron saint of the neighborhood and stone cross dedicated to him was erected in 1929.

Location

Vidovdansko Naselje is located in northern part of Novi Sad, between Klisa in the west, Salajka in the south, Mali Beograd in the east, and Slana Bara in the north.

History
During NATO bombing of Novi Sad in 1999, civilian residential buildings in Vidovdansko Naselje were devastated by NATO bombs.

Features
Well known Najlon market (Najlon pijaca in Serbian) is located in Vidovdansko Naselje. Every Sunday, it is the largest market place in Novi Sad where various goods and services are offered for visitors.

See also
 Neighborhoods of Novi Sad

References

Jovan Mirosavljević, Brevijar ulica Novog Sada 1745-2001, Novi Sad, 2002.
Milorad Grujić, Vodič kroz Novi Sad i okolinu, Novi Sad, 2004.

External links
www.freewebs.com/vidovdanac
www.vidovdanskonaselje.co.sr
www.vidovdanci.co.sr
Detailed map of Novi Sad and Vidovdansko Naselje
Map of Novi Sad

Novi Sad neighborhoods